James Hewlett (1768–1836) was an English flower-painter.

Life 
James Hewlett, born on 15 September 1768, was the son of a gardener and an associate in boyhood of John Britton, the Wiltshire antiquary. He practised chiefly at Bath, painting flowers in water-colours, which are noted for good drawing, colour, and botanical accuracy. He occasionally painted other subjects, such as gipsies, and contributed to the Royal Academy and other exhibitions.

Death 
He died at Park House, Isleworth, on 18 August 1836, and was buried in Isleworth Church, where a monument was erected by his widow.

Works 

 London (Victoria and Albert Museum): Flowers (5 paintings).

Likenesses 

 James Hewlett, self-portrait, oils (middle-aged), Victoria Art Gallery, Bath;
 John Varley, profile pencil drawing, Victoria Art Gallery, Bath.

Identity 
Another painter of the same name, whose relationship is undetermined, practised at Bath at an earlier date. Queen Charlotte visited his studio in 1817. It is difficult to distinguish their works. The elder Hewlett died at Notting Hill, London, in 1829. The sister of one was the wife of Benjamin Barker.

References

Citations

Bibliography 

  
 Peach, Annette (2004). "Hewlett, James (1768–1836), flower painter. In Oxford Dictionary of National Biography. Oxford University Press.
 Oliver, Valerie Cassel, ed. (2011). "Hewlett, James". In Benezit Dictionary of Artists. Oxford University Press.

1768 births
1836 deaths
18th-century English painters
19th-century English painters
English watercolourists